Chartiers Run is a tributary of the Allegheny River located in Westmoreland County in the U.S. state of Pennsylvania. It was named after Peter Chartier, a trapper of French and Native American parentage who established a trading post at the mouth of Chartiers Creek in 1743.

Course

Chartiers Run joins the Allegheny River at the city of Lower Burrell.

See also

 List of rivers of Pennsylvania
 List of tributaries of the Allegheny River

References

External links

U.S. Geological Survey: PA stream gaging stations

Rivers of Westmoreland County, Pennsylvania
Rivers of Pennsylvania
Tributaries of the Allegheny River